Alexander Lange Kielland (18 February 1849 – 6 April 1906) was a Norwegian realistic writer of the 19th century. He is one of the so-called "The Four Greats" of Norwegian literature, along with Henrik Ibsen, Bjørnstjerne Bjørnson and Jonas Lie.

Background
Born in Stavanger, Norway, he grew up in a rich merchant family. He was the son of consul Jens Zetlitz Kielland and great-grandson of Gabriel Schanche Kielland (1760–1821).   Kielland was the younger brother of Norwegian landscape painter Kitty Lange Kielland.

His family also included his son, Jens Zetlitz Kielland, (1873–1926); uncle Jacob Otto Lange (1833–1902),  cousin Axel Christian Zetlitz Kielland (1853–1924),  nephew Jens Zetlitz Monrad Kielland (1866–1926),  cousin Anders Lange (1904–1974) and great nephew Jacob Christie Kielland (1897–1972). His great niece Axeliane Christiane Zetlitz Kielland (1916–1995) married Agnar Mykle (1915–1994).

Career
Despite being born wealthy, he had a sincere affection for the less fortunate, treating his workers well when he was a factory owner. He remained a spokesman for the weak and a critic of society throughout his time as a writer. His best known plays were the satirical comedies Tre Par (1886) and Professoren (1888). He was also well known for his short stories.

Among his most famous works are the novels Gift (1883), Skipper Worse (1882) and Garman & Worse (1880).  Gift (published in English as Poison )  is the first of a trilogy including Fortuna (1884) and St. Hans Fest (1887). In this trilogy, Kielland satirizes the hypocrisy of Norway's clergy. In Gift, Kielland debates the preference for Latin that Norwegian teachers had during his time. The story features a young boy called Marius, lying on his deathbed while repeating Latin grammar.

From 1889 to 1890, Kielland worked as a journalist for the newspaper Stavanger Avis. Kielland virtually stopped writing fiction in 1891 and published only stories which had been published earlier. In 1891 he was designated the mayor of his hometown, Stavanger, until 1902 when he relocated to Molde as county governor of the land Møre og Romsdal.

It has been debated why Kielland ended his career as a writer so early. Some believe that he was so much of a realist that he could not deal with the neo-romantic tendencies of Norwegian literature at the end of the 19th century. A more probable reason is that he chose to focus on his political career.

The biography of Alexander L. Kielland by Tor Obrestad includes thoughts about Kielland dying from obesity. Already from the mid-1880s, Kielland had suffered from shortness of breath. He had several heart attacks, constantly gained weight, and couldn't control his great passion for food.

Publications

Short stories
 Novelletter, 1879
 Nye novelletter, 1880
 To Novelletter fra Danmark, 1882

Novels
 Garman & Worse, 1880 - 
 Arbeidsfolk, 1881
 Else, 1881
 Skipper Worse, 1882.
 Gift, 1883
 Fortuna, 1884
 Sne, 1886
 Sankt Hans Fest, 1887
 Jacob, 1891

Plays
 Paa Hjemvejen, 1878
 Hans Majestæts Foged, 1880
 Det hele er Ingenting, 1880
 Tre par, 1886
 Bettys Formynder, 1887
 Professoren, 1888

Essays
 Forsvarssagen, 1890
 Menneker og Dyr, 1891
 Omkring Napoleon, 1905

References

Further reading
Gran, Gerhard von Lippe  Alexander L. Kielland og hans samtid  (P.T. Dreyer. 1992)
 Grøndahl, Carl Henrik and Nina Tjomsland (editors) The Literary Masters of Norway, with Samples of Their Works (Tanum-Norli. 1978)
Hallgren, Bengt Skitt eller kanel: Omkring Alexander L. Kielland, aren 1878-1906 (Alba. 1987)
Lunde, Johannes  Liv og kunst i konflikt: Alexander L. Kielland 1883-1906 : fra Gift til Jacob; Omkring Napoleon   (Gyldendal. 1975)
Nag, Martin Omkring samfunnsrefseren Alexander L. Kielland: Essays  (Kvekerforlaget. 1999)
Obrestad, Tor To Par: Brevvekslingen Mellom Alexander L. Kielland Og Louise Og Viggo Drewsen (J.W. Cappelen. 1998)
 Risa,  Einar O. Mannen i speilet: Alexander L. Kielland i Stavanger 1888-1902 : en nedtur  (Tiden Norsk. 1999)

External links 

Digitized books and manuscripts by Kielland in the National Library of Norway
 
 
 
An English audiobook of story by Alexander Kielland from historyradio.org on youtube

1849 births
1906 deaths
19th-century Norwegian novelists
Norwegian male short story writers
Norwegian essayists
Norwegian newspaper editors
County governors of Norway
People from Stavanger
19th-century Norwegian people
The Four Greats
19th-century Norwegian dramatists and playwrights
19th-century Norwegian short story writers
19th-century essayists
Norwegian Association for Women's Rights people
Norwegian male dramatists and playwrights